The 1946 Wimbledon Championships took place on the outdoor grass courts at the All England Lawn Tennis and Croquet Club in Wimbledon, London, United Kingdom. The tournament was held from Monday 24 June until Saturday 6 July 1946. It was the 60th staging of the Wimbledon Championships and the first one held after a six-year break due to World War II. In 1946 and 1947 Wimbledon was held before the French Championships and was thus the second Grand Slam tennis event of the year. The Wimbledon Championships would take place every year until 2019, a span of 74 consecutive years before the event would be cancelled in 2020 due to the COVID-19 pandemic.

Finals

Men's singles

 Yvon Petra defeated  Geoff Brown, 6–2, 6–4, 7–9, 5–7, 6–4

Women's singles

 Pauline Betz defeated  Louise Brough, 6–2, 6–4

Men's doubles

 Tom Brown /  Jack Kramer defeated  Geoff Brown /  Dinny Pails, 6–4, 6–4, 6–2

Women's doubles

 Louise Brough /  Margaret Osborne defeated  Pauline Betz /  Doris Hart, 6–3, 2–6, 6–3

Mixed doubles

 Tom Brown /  Louise Brough defeated  Geoff Brown /  Dorothy Bundy, 6–4, 6–4

References

External links
 Official Wimbledon Championships website

 
Wimbledon Championships
Wimbledon Championships
Wimbledon Championships
Wimbledon Championships